The Education of Nicky is a 1921 British silent romance film directed by Arthur Rooke and starring James Knight, Marjorie Villis and Constance Worth. It was based on a novel by May Wynn.

Cast
 James Knight ...  Nicky Malvesty 
 Marjorie Villis ...  Trixie Happinleigh 
 Constance Worth ...  Chloe 
 Mary Rorke ...  Lady Aberleigh 
 Keith Weatherley ...  Colonel Trouville 
 Dolores Courtenay ...  Virginia 
 George Williams ...  Mr. Malvesty 
 Winifred Sadler ...  Mrs. Malvesty

References

External links

1921 films
1920s romance films
British silent feature films
British romance films
1920s English-language films
Films directed by Arthur Rooke
Films based on British novels
British black-and-white films
1920s British films
English-language romance films